Ice-Pick Lodge is a Russian video game developer based in Moscow, founded in 2002 by Nikolay Dybowski. The studio became known in Russia after releasing its first project Pathologic.

Games

Released

Upcoming

Awards
In 2005, Pathologic won several awards in Russia. These being: “Game of the Year” by the Best Computer Games magazine, “Best Russian Game of the Year” by Gameslife And “Best Debut of the Year” by Playground. It was also listed in Ixbt as being one of their top 5 games of the year, and in Igromania as one of their top 3, alongside Half-Life 2 and GTA:San Andreas. Both Pathologic and The Void won the "Most Non-Standard Game" award at the Russian Game Developers Conference in 2005 and 2007, respectively. Pathologic 2 won the “Excellence in Game Design”, “Excellence in Game Narrative” and “Best Desktop Game” awards at DEVgamm 2019. It was also the conference’s Grand Prize winner.

References

External links 

 

Russian companies established in 2002
Companies based in Moscow
Video game companies established in 2002
Video game companies of Russia
Video game development companies